Rockaway is a borough in Morris County, in the U.S. state of New Jersey. As of the 2020 United States census, the borough's population was 6,598, an increase of 160 (+2.5%) from the 2010 census count of 6,438, which in turn reflected a decline of 35 (−0.5%) from the 6,473 counted in the 2000 census.

Rockaway was formed as a borough on June 19, 1894, from portions of Rockaway Township, based on the results of a referendum held the previous day. Additional portions of Rockaway Township were annexed by the borough in 1908.

The borough shares its name with the Rockaway River and the neighboring township. The name is derived from a Native American term, variously said to mean "place of sands", "creek between two hills" or "bushy" / "difficult to cross".

Geography
According to the United States Census Bureau, the borough had a total area of 2.12 square miles (5.49 km2), including 2.07 square miles (5.37 km2) of land and 0.05 square miles (0.12 km2) of water (2.22%).

Rockaway borders the Morris County municipalities of Denville Township and Rockaway Township.

Climate
The climate in this area is characterized by hot, humid summers and generally mild to cool winters.  According to the Köppen Climate Classification system, Rockaway has a humid subtropical climate, abbreviated "Cfa" on climate maps.

Demographics

2010 census

The Census Bureau's 2006–2010 American Community Survey showed that (in 2010 inflation-adjusted dollars) median household income was $77,861 (with a margin of error of +/− $10,631) and the median family income was $108,776 (+/− $9,129). Males had a median income of $57,770 (+/− $13,090) versus $37,868 (+/− $9,230) for females. The per capita income for the borough was $37,636 (+/− $4,186). About 6.3% of families and 6.5% of the population were below the poverty line, including 12.8% of those under age 18 and 1.6% of those age 65 or over.

2000 census
As of the 2000 United States census there were 6,473 people, 2,445 households, and 1,709 families residing in the borough. The population density was 3,098.9 people per square mile (1,195.8/km2). There were 2,491 housing units at an average density of 1,192.5 per square mile (460.2/km2). The racial makeup of the borough was 87.75% White, 1.41% African American, 0.20% Native American, 6.36% Asian, 0.03% Pacific Islander, 2.98% from other races, and 1.27% from two or more races. Hispanic or Latino of any race were 9.39% of the population.

There were 2,445 households, out of which 33.4% had children under the age of 18 living with them, 56.3% were married couples living together, 10.4% had a female householder with no husband present, and 30.1% were non-families. 23.8% of all households were made up of individuals, and 8.1% had someone living alone who was 65 years of age or older. The average household size was 2.64 and the average family size was 3.16.

In the borough the population was spread out, with 23.3% under the age of 18, 6.6% from 18 to 24, 33.6% from 25 to 44, 24.7% from 45 to 64, and 11.9% who were 65 years of age or older. The median age was 38 years. For every 100 females, there were 94.7 males. For every 100 females age 18 and over, there were 91.4 males.

The median income for a household in the borough was $61,002, and the median income for a family was $66,997. Males had a median income of $44,673 versus $35,956 for females. The per capita income for the borough was $26,500. About 3.0% of families and 5.0% of the population were below the poverty line, including 6.4% of those under age 18 and 8.7% of those age 65 or over.

Government

Local government
Rockaway is governed under the Borough form of New Jersey municipal government, which is used in 218 municipalities (of the 564) statewide, making it the most common form of government in New Jersey. The governing body is comprised of the Mayor and the Borough Council, with all positions elected at-large on a partisan basis as part of the November general election. The Mayor is elected directly by the voters to a four-year term of office. The Borough Council is comprised of six members elected to serve three-year terms on a staggered basis, with two seats coming up for election each year in a three-year cycle. The Borough form of government used by Rockaway is a "weak mayor / strong council" government in which council members act as the legislative body with the mayor presiding at meetings and voting only in the event of a tie. The mayor can veto ordinances subject to an override by a two-thirds majority vote of the council. The mayor makes committee and liaison assignments for council members, and most appointments are made by the mayor with the advice and consent of the council. 
  
, the Mayor of Rockaway is Republican Thomas Mulligan, whose term of office ends December 31, 2023. Members of the Rockaway Borough Council are Council President Melissa Burnside (R, 2023), Russell Greuter (R, 2022), Thomas J. Haynes III (R, 2024), James R. Hurley (R, 2024), Patrick McDonald (R, 2023) and Robert Smith (R, 2022).

In October 2019, the Borough Council appointed Patrick McDonald to fill the term expiring in December 2020 that became vacant following the death of Joyce Kanigel the previous month. In January 2020, the Borough Council selected Melissa Burnside from a list of three candidates nominated by the Republican municipal committee to fill the seat expiring in December 2020 that became vacant when Thomas Mulligan resigned to take office as mayor.

Federal, state, and county representation
Rockaway Borough is located in the 11th Congressional District and is part of New Jersey's 25th state legislative district.

 

Morris County is governed by a Board of County Commissioners comprised of seven members who are elected at-large in partisan elections to three-year terms on a staggered basis, with either one or three seats up for election each year as part of the November general election. Actual day-to-day operation of departments is supervised by County Administrator, John Bonanni. , Morris County's Commissioners are
Commissioner Director Tayfun Selen (R, Chatham Township, term as commissioner ends December 31, 2023; term as director ends 2022),
Commissioner Deputy Director John Krickus (R, Washington Township, term as commissioner ends 2024; term as deputy director ends 2022),
Douglas Cabana (R, Boonton Township, 2022), 
Kathryn A. DeFillippo (R, Roxbury, 2022),
Thomas J. Mastrangelo (R, Montville, 2022),
Stephen H. Shaw (R, Mountain Lakes, 2024) and
Deborah Smith (R, Denville, 2024).
The county's constitutional officers are the County Clerk and County Surrogate (both elected for five-year terms of office) and the County Sheriff (elected for a three-year term). , they are 
County Clerk Ann F. Grossi (R, Parsippany–Troy Hills, 2023),
Sheriff James M. Gannon (R, Boonton Township, 2022) and
Surrogate Heather Darling (R, Roxbury, 2024).

Politics
As of March 2011, there were a total of 3,911 registered voters in Rockaway, of which 838 (21.4%) were registered as Democrats, 1,359 (34.7%) were registered as Republicans and 1,710 (43.7%) were registered as Unaffiliated. There were 4 voters registered as Libertarians or Greens.

In the 2012 presidential election, Republican Mitt Romney received 51.4% of the vote (1,464 cast), ahead of Democrat Barack Obama with 47.8% (1,362 votes), and other candidates with 0.8% (22 votes), among the 2,872 ballots cast by the borough's 4,103 registered voters (24 ballots were spoiled), for a turnout of 70.0%. In the 2012 presidential election, Republican Mitt Romney received 51.2% of the vote (1,464 cast), while Democrat Barack Obama received 47.6% (1,362 votes) and other candidates collected 1.2% (34 votes), among the 2,872 ballots cast by the borough's 4,103 registered voters, for a turnout of 70.0%. In the 2008 presidential election, Republican John McCain received 53.0% of the vote (1,625 cast), ahead of Democrat Barack Obama with 45.3% (1,388 votes) and other candidates with 0.9% (28 votes), among the 3,067 ballots cast by the borough's 4,007 registered voters, for a turnout of 76.5%. In the 2004 presidential election, Republican George W. Bush received 58.6% of the vote (1,715 ballots cast), outpolling Democrat John Kerry with 40.3% (1,180 votes) and other candidates with 0.6% (24 votes), among the 2,926 ballots cast by the borough's 3,938 registered voters, for a turnout percentage of 74.3%.

In the 2013 gubernatorial election, Republican Chris Christie received 69.1% of the vote (1,146 cast), ahead of Democrat Barbara Buono with 28.7% (476 votes), and other candidates with 2.2% (36 votes), among the 1,685 ballots cast by the borough's 4,071 registered voters (27 ballots were spoiled), for a turnout of 41.4%. In the 2009 gubernatorial election, Republican Chris Christie received 59.9% of the vote (1,188 ballots cast), ahead of Democrat Jon Corzine with 28.9% (573 votes), Independent Chris Daggett with 8.4% (167 votes) and other candidates with 1.3% (26 votes), among the 1,984 ballots cast by the borough's 3,962 registered voters, yielding a 50.1% turnout.

Education
The Rockaway Borough Public Schools serve students in pre-kindergarten through eighth grade. As of the 2020–21 school year, the district, comprised of two schools, had an enrollment of 515 students and 52.8 classroom teachers (on an FTE basis), for a student–teacher ratio of 9.8:1. Schools in the district (with 2020–21 enrollment data from the National Center for Education Statistics) are 
Lincoln Elementary School with 223 students in grades Pre-K–3 and 
Thomas Jefferson Middle School with 283 students in grades 4–8.

Public school students in ninth through twelfth grades attend Morris Hills High School, in Rockaway Borough, which also serves students from Wharton and some from Rockaway Township (the White Meadow Lake section and other southern portions of the township). The Academy for Mathematics, Science, and Engineering, a magnet high school program that is part of the Morris County Vocational School District is jointly operated on the Morris Hills campus. The two high schools are part of the Morris Hills Regional High School District. As of the 2020–21 school year, the high school had an enrollment of 1,218 students and 119.7 classroom teachers (on an FTE basis), for a student–teacher ratio of 10.2:1.

Divine Mercy Academy, operated by the Roman Catholic Diocese of Paterson, is the only private school in Rockaway. It opened in September 2016 with the merger of the two Catholic schools in Rockaway, Sacred Heart of Jesus School and St. Cecilia School.

Transportation

Roads and highways

Interstate 80 clips the northeast corner of the borough. Access is provided via Exit 37 (County Route 513). U.S. Route 46 passes through the southern end of the borough.

Public transportation
NJ Transit train service does not stop in the borough, but is accessible in adjacent towns at Denville station and Dover station. The Morris and Essex Railroad and its successor the Delaware, Lackawanna, and Western Railroad formerly provided service to the town, but the Boonton Branch bypass was constructed in 1902 that provided a much shorter path to Dover, so service was cut in 1948.

NJ Transit offers local bus service on the 880 route, which replaced the MCM10 route that operated until 2010.

Lakeland Bus Lines offers bus service along Main Street to the New York City Port Authority Bus Terminal in Midtown Manhattan on its Route 46 and Route 80 lines.

In pop culture
Many scenes (the train tracks, Main Street and The Old Mill Tavern) from the 2003 movie, The Station Agent, were filmed in Rockaway. The film starred actor Peter Dinklage.

The band Houston Calls had its start here.

Notable people

People who were born in, residents of, or otherwise closely associated with Rockaway include:

 Bruce Bannon (born 1951), former NFL linebacker
 Clifford Meth (born 1961), author, often refers to places in Rockaway in his stories
 Sue Naegle, business executive who was President of HBO Entertainment
 General Raymond T. Odierno (1954–2021), Chief of Staff of the United States Army and former commander of United States Forces – Iraq
 General Gustave F. Perna (born 1960), commander of United States Army Materiel Command
 Frank Joseph Rodimer (1927–2018), American Roman Catholic bishop, was born in Rockaway
 Erik Storz (born 1975), American football linebacker who played in the NFL for the Jacksonville Jaguars
* Rachel Wainer Apter  (born 1980/1981), lawyer who was nominated in March 2021 to be an Associate Justice of the Supreme Court of New Jersey
 June Walker (1934–2008), Chairperson of the Conference of Presidents of Major American Jewish Organizations and a member of AIPAC's Executive Committee who was the national president of Hadassah Women's Zionist Organization of America

References

External links

 Rockaway Borough website
 Rockaway Borough Public Schools
 
 School Data for the Rockaway Borough Public Schools, National Center for Education Statistics
 Abandoned Mine Research. Includes Mines of Rockaway Twp.
 Abandoned Mines of Rockaway, New Jersey
 Regional area newspaper

 
1894 establishments in New Jersey
Borough form of New Jersey government
Boroughs in Morris County, New Jersey
Populated places established in 1894